Queen Munhye of the Jeongju Ryu clan was a Goryeo princess as the first and oldest daughter of King Taejo and Queen Jeongdeok who became the wife of her half brother, King Munwon. With this marriage, she then followed her maternal clan, the Jeongju Ryu. Though her younger sister, she would become the maternal aunt of King Seongjong and became the mother-in-law of her half nephew, King Gyeongjong since her only daughter married him as his second wife. Alongside her husband who was posthumously honoured as a king, she was also posthumously honoured as a queen.

References

Royal consorts of the Goryeo Dynasty
Goryeo princesses
10th-century Korean people
Year of birth unknown
Year of death unknown